Kanareyka is a rural locality (a village) in Mikhaylovsky Selsoviet, Bizhbulyaksky District, Bashkortostan, Russia. The population was 4 as of 2010. There is 1 street.

Geography 
Kanareyka is located 26 km northwest of Bizhbulyak (the district's administrative centre) by road.

References 

Rural localities in Bizhbulyaksky District